Belgium was represented by Tonia, with the song "Un peu de poivre, un peu de sel", at the 1966 Eurovision Song Contest, which took place on 5 March in Luxembourg City. Tonia was chosen internally to be the Belgian representative, and the song was chosen in the national final on 25 January.

Before Eurovision

Artist selection
RTB had internally selected Tonia to represent Belgium in the Eurovision Song Contest 1966.

Avant-première Eurovision
Avant-première Eurovision was the national final format developed by RTB in order to select Belgium's entry for the Eurovision Song Contest 1966. The competition was held on 25 January 1966 and was broadcast on RTB.

Competing entries
Following announcement of Tonia as Belgian representative, song submission period was opened where composers were able to submit their songs. RTB in collaboration with SABAM selected four songs from more than 150 received songs to participate in the contest.

Final
Final was held on 25 January 1966 from 20:40 to 21:10 CET. Four songs competed in the contest with the winner being decided upon by public postcard voting.

At Eurovision 
On the night of the final Tonia performed 3rd in the running order, following Denmark and preceding Luxembourg. Each national jury awarded 5-3-1 point(s) to their top three songs, and at the close of the voting "Un peu de poivre, un peu de sel" had received 14 points (5 from Germany and the Netherlands, 3 from Portugal and 1 from Sweden), placing Belgium joint 4th (with Ireland) of the 18 competing entries. This was Belgium's highest Eurovision finish to date, and would remain so until Jean Vallée's second place in 1978. The Belgian jury awarded its 5 points to contest winners Austria.

Voting

References 

1966
Countries in the Eurovision Song Contest 1966
Eurovision